Theodore is an unincorporated area and census-designated place (CDP) in Mobile County, Alabama, United States. The population was 6,270 at the 2020 census. It is a part of the Mobile metropolitan area. Prior to 1900 this area was known as "Clements", but it is now named for William Theodore Hieronymous, a sawmill operator and postmaster.

Geography
It is bordered to the northeast by the city of Mobile (the original center of Theodore is now within the Mobile city limits) and to the northwest by Tillmans Corner. Interstate 10 forms the border between Theodore and Tillmans Corner, with access from Exit 13 (Theodore Dawes Road). I-10 leads northeast  to downtown Mobile and west  to the Pascagoula, Mississippi, area.

Demographics

Theodore first appeared on the 1890 U.S. Census as a village. It did not appear again on the census until 1980 when it was designated a CDP (census-designated place).

2000 census
As of the census of 2000, there were 6,811 people, 2,483 households, and 1,926 families living in the CDP. The racial makeup of the CDP was 71.11% White, 25.58% Black or African American, 0.62% Native American, 1.29% Asian, 0.41% from other races, and 1.00% from two or more races. 1.38% of the population were Hispanic or Latino of any race.

There were 2,483 households, out of which 38.4% had children under the age of 18 living with them, 53.6% were married couples living together, 19.4% had a female householder with no husband present, and 22.4% were non-families. 19.3% of all households were made up of individuals, and 7.1% had someone living alone who was 65 years of age or older. The average household size was 2.73 and the average family size was 3.11.

In the CDP, the population was spread out, with 28.5% under the age of 18, 9.8% from 18 to 24, 29.2% from 25 to 44, 22.0% from 45 to 64, and 10.5% who were 65 years of age or older. The median age was 34 years. For every 100 females, there were 92.9 males. For every 100 females age 18 and over, there were 89.6 males.

The median income for a household in the CDPwas $33,750, and the median income for a family was $36,500. Males had a median income of $32,297 versus $19,679 for females. The per capita income for the CDP was $15,129. About 16.3% of families and 18.7% of the population were below the poverty line, including 25.6% of those under age 18 and 23.5% of those age 65 or over.

2010 census
As of the census of 2010, there were 6,130 people, 2,293 households, and 1,681 families living in the CDP. The racial makeup of the CDP was 79.7% White, 13.3% Black or African American, 1.1% Native American, 2.4% Asian, 1.1% from other races, and 2.2% from two or more races. 3.2% of the population were Hispanic or Latino of any race.

There were 2,293 households, out of which 35.7% had children under the age of 18 living with them, 49.0% were married couples living together, 17.6% had a female householder with no husband present, and 26.7% were non-families. 21.8% of all households were made up of individuals, and 7.9% had someone living alone who was 65 years of age or older. The average household size was 2.67 and the average family size was 3.08.

In the CDP, the population was spread out, with 27.4% under the age of 18, 9.8% from 18 to 24, 27.7% from 25 to 44, 23.7% from 45 to 64, and 11.4% who were 65 years of age or older. The median age was 34.3 years. For every 100 females, there were 92.8 males. For every 100 females age 18 and over, there were 93.3 males.

The median income for a household in the CDP was $41,473, and the median income for a family was $44,950. Males had a median income of $33,673 versus $23,658 for females. The per capita income for the CDP was $17,384. About 17.9% of families and 22.6% of the population were below the poverty line, including 37.8% of those under age 18 and 10.8% of those age 65 or over.

2020 census

As of the 2020 United States census, there were 6,270 people, 2,035 households, and 1,465 families residing in the CDP.

Education
The community is in the Mobile County Public School System.

Two elementary schools, Mary Borroughs and Nan Gray Davis, serve sections of the CDP. All residents are zoned to Hankins Middle School and Theodore High School.

Points of interest 
 Bellingrath Gardens
 Mobile Greyhound park
 Fowl River

Notable people
 Paul Bearer (William Moody), wrestling manager for The Undertaker
 Bernie Carbo, former Major League Baseball player
 Kentrail Davis, minor league baseball player
 Rodger McFarlane, first executive director of Gay Men's Health Crisis.
 C. J. Mosley, College football linebacker for Alabama and current NFL linebacker for the New York Jets
 Etric Pruitt, professional football player
 Willie Quinnie, former NFL wide receiver
 Geoff Ramsey, co-founder of Rooster Teeth and Achievement Hunter
 Andre Royal, former NFL linebacker

References

Census-designated places in Mobile County, Alabama
Census-designated places in Alabama
Unincorporated communities in Alabama